Bactris plumeriana is a species of palm endemic to Hispaniola.

Taxonomy
According to Salzman and Judd B. plumeriana forms a clade with B. cubensis and B. jamaicana, the other Greater Antillean Bactris species.

References

plumeriana
Trees of Haiti
Trees of the Dominican Republic